Erik Skovgaard Knudsen (born 1981) is a Danish mountain bike orienteer. He won a bronze medal in the long distance at the 2010 World MTB Orienteering Championships in Montalegre, and a silver medal in the relay, together with Bjarke Refslund and Lasse Brun Pedersen.

References

External links
 

Danish orienteers
Male orienteers
Danish male cyclists
Mountain bike orienteers
Living people
Place of birth missing (living people)
1981 births